Decalogue is the first full-length solo album from Jedi Mind Tricks producer Stoupe the Enemy of Mankind. The album was released on March 31, 2009 under Babygrande Records. Vocals are provided by various rappers and the production is entirely handled by Stoupe himself.

Track listing
All songs are produced by Stoupe the Enemy of Mankind

References

External links 
 
 Jedi Mind Tricks official site

Babygrande Records albums
2009 albums